Irina Ektova (née Litvinenko; born 8 January 1987, in Petropavlovsk) is a Kazakhstani triple jumper. She is married to Yevgeniy Ektov.

She competed at the 2008, 2012, and 2016 Summer Olympics without reaching the final.

Her personal best jump is 14.48 metres, achieved in June 2011 in Almaty.

Competition record

References

1987 births
Living people
Kazakhstani female triple jumpers
Olympic female triple jumpers
Olympic athletes of Kazakhstan
Athletes (track and field) at the 2008 Summer Olympics
Athletes (track and field) at the 2012 Summer Olympics
Athletes (track and field) at the 2016 Summer Olympics
Asian Games bronze medalists for Kazakhstan
Asian Games medalists in athletics (track and field)
Athletes (track and field) at the 2014 Asian Games
Athletes (track and field) at the 2018 Asian Games
Medalists at the 2014 Asian Games
Competitors at the 2007 Summer Universiade
Competitors at the 2009 Summer Universiade
Competitors at the 2011 Summer Universiade
Competitors at the 2013 Summer Universiade
Competitors at the 2015 Summer Universiade
World Athletics Championships athletes for Kazakhstan
Asian Indoor Athletics Championships winners
Kazakhstani people of Russian descent
Athletes (track and field) at the 2020 Summer Olympics
People from Petropavl
20th-century Kazakhstani women
21st-century Kazakhstani women